

Rudolf Freiherr von Waldenfels (4 December 1895  – 14 August 1969) was a German general during World War II who commanded the 6th Panzer Division. He was a recipient of the Knight's Cross of the Iron Cross with Oak Leaves of Nazi Germany.

Awards and decorations
 Iron Cross (1914) 2nd Class (16 October 1915) & 1st Class (27 April 1924)
 Clasp to the Iron Cross (1939) 2nd Class (24 September 1939) & 1st Class (12 October 1939)
 Knight's Cross of the Iron Cross with Oak Leaves
 Knight's Cross on 11 October 1941 as Oberstleutnant.
 Oak Leaves on 14 May 1944 as Generalmajor and commander of the 6. Panzer-Division

References

Citations

Bibliography

 
 

1895 births
1969 deaths
Barons of Germany
Lieutenant generals of the German Army (Wehrmacht)
German Army personnel of World War I
Recipients of the clasp to the Iron Cross, 1st class
Recipients of the Knight's Cross of the Iron Cross with Oak Leaves
Military personnel from Ingolstadt
People from the Kingdom of Bavaria
Major generals of the Reichswehr
German Army generals of World War II